Nikolay Timofeyevich Tanayev (5 November 1945 – 19 July 2020) was a Kyrgyz politician, who served as the Prime Minister of Kyrgyzstan from 2002 to 2005, under President Askar Akayev.

Career
He served as Deputy Prime Minister under Kurmanbek Bakiyev and was made acting PM on 22 May 2002 after Akayev fired Bakiyev. He officially became PM eight days later when the Supreme Council confirmed him.

As Prime Minister he survived a motion of no confidence vote on 8 April 2004. The legislature voted 27 to 14 to remove him from office, short of the necessary 30 votes.

He was the first ethnic non-Asian Prime Minister of Kyrgyzstan since independence.

Revolution and exile
On 24 March 2005 Tanayev resigned as Prime Minister in the midst of the Tulip Revolution. Almost a month later he became special envoy for foreign economic relations in his native Penza region in Russia. However, by June the Acting Prosecutor-General, Azimbek Beknazarov told Parliament that his office had issued an order for Tanayev's arrest. One of the charges relates to 40 million soms ($977,000) in state funds allegedly transferred to a company controlled by his son. He lived in exile in St. Petersburg on 6 Bolshaya Morskaya Street.

References

External links

Official webpage 
Government Website
Moscow on alert for Muslim militancy

1945 births
2020 deaths
People from Mokshansky District
Prime Ministers of Kyrgyzstan
Kyrgyzstani people of Russian descent
Heads of government who were later imprisoned
Deaths from the COVID-19 pandemic in Russia